Tailholt was a former name of two settlements in the U.S. state of Indiana:
Finly, Indiana in Hancock County
Pickard, Indiana in Clinton County